Steve Docherty (born 6 May 1950) is a former professional tennis player from Australia.

Docherty enjoyed most of his tennis success while playing doubles. During his career, he finished runner-up in 4 doubles events.

His most notable career achievement was when he surprised the world to defeat former world number one Arthur Ashe at Wimbledon in 1978.

After completing his tennis career, Docherty became a successful businessman, owning and operating three McDonald's franchises along the East coast of New South Wales.

Career finals

Doubles (4 runner-ups)

References

External links
 
 

Australian male tennis players
Tennis people from New South Wales
1950 births
Living people
Sportspeople from Newcastle, New South Wales
20th-century Australian people
21st-century Australian people